Rakovski may refer to:

Places
Rakovski (town), a town in Plovdiv Province, Bulgaria
Rakovski, Dobrich Province, a village in Dobrich Province, Bulgaria
Rakovski, Razgrad Province, a village in Razgrad Province, Bulgaria

People with the surname
 Abraham Abba Rakovski (1854–1921), writer and translator
 Georgi Sava Rakovski, Bulgarian revolutionary
 Christian Rakovsky, Bulgarian-born Bolshevik politician

See also
Rakowski
Rakovsky

Bulgarian-language surnames